FK Žiar nad Hronom was a Slovak football team, based in the town of Žiar nad Hronom. The club was founded in 1929.  In the summer of 2012, FK Žiar nad Hronom merged with TJ Sokol Dolná Ždaňa to form FK Pohronie.

The club's most notable result on a national level was a achieving the semi-final stage of the Slovak Cup in 2001.

Notable players 
Had international caps for their respective countries. Players whose name is listed in bold represented their countries while playing for FK. Players whose name is listed in italics played for the club in junior teams only.

 Ľubomír Michalík
 Adam Nemec
 Milan Nemec
 Milan Škriniar
 Lukáš Tesák

Notes

References

External links 
 official club website 

Žiar nad Hronom
Žiar nad Hronom
Žiar nad Hronom
1929 establishments in Slovakia
2012 disestablishments in Slovakia